Football Club Kara-Balta is a Kyrgyz professional football club based in Kara-Balta, that competes in the Kyrgyz Premier League.

History 
1992: Founded as KVT Khimik Kara-Balta.
1995: Renamed KVT Dinamo Kara-Balta.
2001: Renamed FC Bakay Kara-Balta.
2003: Renamed FC Jayil-Baatyr Kara-Balta.
2009: Renamed FC Khimik Kara-Balta.
2015: Renamed FC Kara-Balta.

Domestic history

Players

Current squad

References

External links 
 Kara-Balta squad

Football clubs in Kyrgyzstan
1992 establishments in Kyrgyzstan